The Counter-Earth is a hypothetical body of the Solar System that orbits on the other side of the solar system from Earth.
A Counter-Earth or Antichthon was hypothesized by the pre-Socratic Greek philosopher Philolaus (c. 470 – c. 385 BC) to support his non-geocentric cosmology, in which all objects in the universe revolve around a "Central Fire" (unseen from Earth and distinct from the Sun which also revolves around it).

In modern times a hypothetical planet always on the other side of the Sun from Earth has been called a "Counter-Earth", and has been a recurring theme in UFO claims, as well as in fiction (particularly science fiction).

Greek Pythagorean universe

An astronomical system positing that the Earth, Moon, Sun, planets and unseen "counter-earth" revolve around an unseen "Central Fire" was developed in the 5th century BC and attributed to the Pythagorean philosopher Philolaus. Philolaus' universe moved "the earth from the center of the cosmos," and provided the insight that "the apparent motion of the heavenly bodies" was (in large part) due to "the real motion of the observer"—i.e. Earth.

In Philolaus' system, the Earth and Counter-Earth revolved around the unseen Central Fire every 24 hours, while the Moon's revolution was monthly, and the Sun's yearly. It was the Earth's speedy travel past the slower moving Sun that resulted in the appearance on Earth of the Sun rising and setting. Further from the Central Fire, the Planets' movement was slower still, and the outermost "sky" (i.e. stars) probably fixed.

Counter-Earth
Along with the Central Fire, the "mysterious" Counter-Earth (Antichthon) was the other heavenly body not visible from Earth. Aristotle described it as "another Earth," from which Greek scholar George Burch infers that it must be similar in size, shape and constitution to Earth. Some (such as astronomer John Louis Emil Dreyer) have thought that Philolaus had it following an orbit such that it was always located between Earth and the Central Fire. However, Burch argues that Philolaus must have thought that it orbited on the other side of the Fire from Earth. Since "counter" means "opposite," and opposite could only be in respect to the Central Fire, it follows that the Counter-Earth must be orbiting 180 degrees from Earth.

According to Aristotle—a critic of the Pythagoreans—the function of the Counter-Earth was to explain "eclipses of the moon and their frequency", which could not be explained by Earth alone blocking the light of the sun if Earth did not revolve around the sun. Aristotle suggested that it was also introduced "to raise the number of heavenly bodies around the central fire from nine to ten, which the Pythagoreans regarded as the perfect number".

However, Burch believes Aristotle was having a joke "at the expense of Pythagorean number theory," and that the true purpose of the Counter-Earth was to "balance" Philolaus' cosmos—balance being needed because without a counter there would be only one dense, massive object in the system—Earth. Although his system had both the Earth and the Planets orbiting a single point, the ancient Greeks did not consider Earth a "planet." In the time before Galileo could observe from his telescope that planets were spheres like Earth, they were thought to be different from stars only in brightness and in their motion, and like stars composed of a fiery or ethereal matter having little or no density. However, the Earth was obviously made of the dense elements of earth and water. According to Burch,
If there was a single Earth revolving at some distance from the center of space, then the universe's center of gravity, located in the Earth as its only dense body, would not coincide with its spatial center ... The universe, consequently, would be off center, so to speak—lopsided and asymmetric—a notion repugnant to any Greek, and doubly so to a Pythagorean. 
This could be corrected by another body with the same mass as Earth, orbiting the same central point but 180 degrees from Earth—the Counter-Earth.

Later
In the 1st century A.D., after the idea of a spherical Earth had gained more general acceptance, Pomponius Mela, a Latin cosmographer, developed an updated version of the idea, wherein a spherical Earth must have a more or less balanced distribution of land and water, even though all known continents were in the northern hemisphere. Mela drew a map which postulated a continental landmass in the unknown, southern half of Earth—the antipodes—below the equator and the tropics, climes which he believed uninhabitable and impassably hot. Mela ascribed the name "Antichthones" to the inhabitants of this continent.

Modern era

Philolaus's ideas were all eventually superseded by the modern realization that a spherical Earth rotating on its own axis was one of several spherical planets following the laws of gravity and revolving around a much larger Sun. The idea of a Counter-Earth waned after the heliocentric model of the solar system became widely accepted from the 16th century. In the contemporary world, "Counter-Earth" usually refers to a hypothetical planet with an orbit as Burch described, on the other side of the "Central fire"—i.e. the Sun. It cannot be seen from Earth, not because Earth faces away from the center, but because the Sun's great size blocks its view. It has been a recurring motif in science fiction, fiction—often serving as an allegory for the real Earth—and UFO claims. The 1968 Scientific Study of Unidentified Flying Objects headed by Edward Condon at the University of Colorado even included a "Numerical Experiment on the Possible Existence of an 'Anti-Earth as an appendix.

Detectability

A Counter-Earth could still be detected from the Earth for a number of reasons. Even if the Sun blocked its view from Earth, a Counter-Earth would have gravitational influence (perturbation) upon the other planets, comets and man-made probes of the Solar System. Researchers have detected no such influence, and indeed space probes sent to Venus, Mars and other places could not have successfully flown by or landed on their targets if a Counter-Earth existed, as the navigational calculations for their journeys did not take any putative Counter-Earth into account.

Any planetary sized body 180 degrees from Earth should also have been visible to some space probes, such as NASA's STEREO coronagraph probes (two spacecraft launched into orbits around the Sun in 2006, one farther ahead of and one behind the Earth's orbit) which would have seen the Counter-Earth during the first half of 2007. The separation of the STEREO spacecraft from Earth would give them a view of the L3 point during the early phase of the mission.

A Counter-Earth would also eventually be visible from Earth because the gravitational forces of the other planets on it would make its own orbit unstable. Venus has 82% of the mass of Earth and would come within 0.3 AU of the location of a Counter-Earth every 20 months, providing considerable gravitational pull that over the years would move its orbit into sight of observers on Earth.

For Counter-Earth orbiting the same path as Earth to always stay 180 degrees from Earth, the two planets would have to have circular orbits, but Earth's orbit is elliptical. According to Kepler's second law, a planet revolves faster when it is close to the star, so a Counter-Earth following the Earth on the same orbit with half a year of delay would sometimes not be exactly 180 degrees from Earth.

References in culture

Twin Earths is an American science fiction comic strip written by Oskar Lebeck and drawn by Alden McWilliams that ran in Sunday and daily newspapers from 1952 until 1963. The strip was distributed by United Feature Syndicate. The daily strip began on June 16, 1952, the Sunday on March 1, 1953. The Sunday was drawn in a half page format, but it was available in smaller formats with dropped panels.
Gor is the name of the Counter-Earth that is the setting for a series of 35 novels by John Norman.
The 1969 science-fiction film Doppelgänger (also known as Journey to the Far Side of the Sun), depicts the discovery and investigation of another planet sharing Earth's orbit on the opposite side of the Sun.
Two 2011 films—Another Earth and Lars von Trier's film Melancholia—feature a plot in which a planet emerges from behind the Sun and approaches Earth.
Several Marvel Comics or spinoffs of comics were set, or had parts of a story set, on Counter-Earth. These include the High Evolutionary, the Spider-Man Unlimited TV series and the associated comic book, Infinity Crusade: Paradise Omega, and the Heroes Reborn Earth ("more of a Pocket Dimension than an actual planet").
In The Adventures Of Superman radio series, the planet Krypton is said to be "situated on the other side of the Sun" from the Earth in the first episode.
Antikhthon, a piece of music by Iannis Xenakis.
In the 1969 kaiju film Gamera vs. Guiron, a Counter-Earth named "Terra" exists on the opposite side of the Solar System to Earth, but presumably within the same habitable zone. A UFO takes two boys to the planet, where they are threatened by a pair of the final members of the Terran race, who were decimated by extraterrestrial Space Gyaos, and their "guard dog" monster Guiron. Gamera comes to Terra to save the children and, after a long fight, is eventually victorious against Guiron.
In The Stranger (also known as Stranded in Space), astronaut Neil Stryker accidentally finds himself on a planet called Terra, which is described very similarly to the one in Gamera vs. Guiron, but the only other connection between these two movies is that they were the both used in episodes of the third season of Mystery Science Theater 3000, with only two episodes between them.
In Doctor Who, the planet Mondas was once a Counter-Earth that left Earth's orbit when the Moon arrived from outer space and the gravitational fields were unbalanced. The planet floated to the extremes of the Solar System and froze so that its inhabitants were forced to turn themselves into a half-human, half-machine species, the Cybermen, as revealed in Season 4 episode The Tenth Planet. Previously, in 1963, the Doctor Who production team commissioned scriptwriter Malcolm Hulke to write The Hidden Planet, a story set on a Counter-Earth. The script was eventually abandoned, but eight subsequent Doctor Who scripts written or co-written by Hulke were televised between 1967 and 1974.
Contemporary Greek science-fiction-fantasy author Dimosthenis Liakopoulos has described Arakoula-1 as a sister planet of Earth in his book The Planet of Silence.
In the science fiction television series Lexx, twin planets Fire and Water orbit each other and counter-orbit the Earth.

See also
Pythagorean astronomical system
Globus Cassus
Co-orbital moon
Fictional planets of the Solar System

Notes

References

Further reading
The Secret Teachings of All Ages: An Encyclopedic Outline of Masonic, Hermetic, Qabbalistic and Rosicrucian Symbolical Philosophy, by Manly P. Hall, Philosophical Research Society Inc. 
Book of Earths, by Edna Kenton, Kessinger Publishing.

External links

 
Ancient Greek astronomy
Early scientific cosmologies
Non-scientific hypothetical planets
Hypothetical bodies of the Solar System